Love on Your Side – The Best of Thompson Twins is a double disc compilation (total running time: 152'58" minutes) of 36 tracks by British pop band Thompson Twins, released in 2007. Aside from their numerous hits, the collection also contains many non-single tracks from their successful 1983-85 period (including the entirety of the band's Quick Step and Side Kick and Into The Gap albums, and all but two tracks from their Here's To Future Days album).

Track listing

CD 1
"In the Name of Love" - 3:49
"Lies" - 3:14
"Love On Your Side" - 4:01
"We Are Detective" - 3:07
"Watching" - 4:00
"Hold Me Now" - 4:49
"All Fall Out" - 5:29
"Bouncing" - 2:39
"Love Lies Bleeding" - 2:54
"Doctor! Doctor!" - 4:42
"You Take Me Up" - 4:29
"Sister of Mercy" - 5:11
"Lay Your Hands on Me" - 4:25
"Don't Mess with Doctor Dream" - 4:27
"King for a Day" - 5:25
"Revolution" - 4:08
"Get That Love" - 4:01
"In the Name of Love '88" - 5:20

CD 2
"If You Were Here" - 3:00
"Judy Do" - 3:48
"Tears" - 5:07
"Kamikaze" - 3:59
"Day After Day" - 3:54
"No Peace for the Wicked" - 4:08
"Who Can Stop the Rain" - 5:48
"Storm on the Sea" - 5:36
"Stillwaters" - 3:39
"The Gap" - 4:48
"Future Days" - 3:02
"You Killed the Clown" - 4:55
"Love Is the Law" - 4:47
"Breakaway" - 3:35
"Follow Your Heart" - 3:58
"20th Century" - 4:02
"Perfect Day" - 4:26
"Long Goodbye" - 4:16

2007 compilation albums
Thompson Twins albums